Substrate is a term used in materials science and engineering to describe the base material on which processing is conducted. This surface could be used to produce new film or layers of material such as deposited coatings.  It could be the base to which paint, adhesives, or adhesive tape is bonded.

A typical substrate might be rigid such as metal, concrete, or glass, onto which a coating might be deposited.  Flexible substrates are also used.
With all coating processes, the condition of the surface of the substrate can strongly affect the bond of subsequent layers.  This can include cleanliness, smoothness, surface energy, moisture, etc.  Some substrates are anisotropic with surface properties being different depending on the direction: examples include wood and paper products.

Coatings

Coating can be by a variety of processes:
 Adhesives and Adhesive tapes
 Coating and printing processes
 Chemical vapor deposition and physical vapor deposition
 Conversion coating
 Anodizing
 Chromate conversion coating
 Plasma electrolytic oxidation
 Phosphate (coating)
 Paint
 Enamel (paint)
Powder coating
 Industrial coating
 Silicate mineral paint
 Fusion bonded epoxy coating (FBE coating)
 Pickled and oiled, a type of plate steel coating.
 Plating
 Electroless plating 
 Electrochemical plating
 Polymer coatings, such as Teflon
 Sputtered or vacuum deposited materials
 Enamel (vitreous)

In optics, glass may be used as a substrate for an optical coating—either an antireflection coating to reduce reflection, or a mirror coating to enhance it.

A substrate may be also an engineered surface where an unintended or natural process occurs, like in:
 Fouling
 Corrosion
 Biofouling
 Heterogeneous catalysis
 Adsorption

See also 
 List of coating techniques
 Thin film
Wetting

References

Chemical processes
Coatings
Industrial processes
Materials science